The 1947 Texas City disaster was an industrial accident that occurred on April 16, 1947, in the port of Texas City, Texas, United States, located in Galveston Bay. It was the deadliest industrial accident in U.S. history and one of history's largest non-nuclear explosions. 

The explosion was triggered by a mid-morning fire on board the French-registered vessel SS Grandcamp (docked at port), which detonated her cargo of about 2,300 tons (about 2,100 metric tons) of ammonium nitrate. This started a chain reaction of fires and explosions aboard other ships and in nearby oil-storage facilities, ultimately killing at least 581 people, including all but one member of Texas City's volunteer fire department.

The disaster drew the first class action lawsuit against the United States government, on behalf of 8,485 plaintiffs, under the 1946 Federal Tort Claims Act.

Ships
SS Grandcamp was a recently re-activated 437-foot-long (133 m) Liberty ship. Originally named SS Benjamin R. Curtis in Los Angeles in 1942, the ship served in the Pacific theatre and was mothballed in Philadelphia after World War II. In a Cold War gesture, the ship was assigned by the U.S. to the French Line to assist in the rebuilding of France, along with other efforts in Europe. Along with the ammonium nitrate—a very common cargo on the high seas—it was carrying small arms ammunition, machinery, and bales of sisal twine on the deck. Another ship in the harbor, SS High Flyer, was docked about 600 feet (200 m) away from Grandcamp. The ammonium nitrate aboard the two ships, and fertilizer in an adjacent warehouse, were intended for export to farmers in Europe. Grandcamp had arrived from Houston, where the port authority did not permit the loading of ammonium nitrate.

Cargo
Grandcamp had a mixed cargo, containing chiefly ammonium nitrate, but also twine, peanuts, tobacco, some small arms ammunition, engineering equipment, and cotton. The ammonium nitrate, needed either as fertilizer or an explosive, was manufactured in Nebraska and Iowa and shipped to Texas City by rail before being loaded onto Grandcamp. It was manufactured in a patented process, mixed with clay, petrolatum, rosin and paraffin wax to avoid moisture caking. It was packaged in paper sacks, then transported and stored at higher temperatures that increased its chemical activity. Longshoremen reported the bags were warm to the touch before loading.

Fire
On April 16, 1947, around 8 a.m., smoke was spotted in the cargo hold of Grandcamp while she was still moored. Longshoremen used a gallon jug of water and two fire extinguishers, but they had no effect and the cargo hold filled with smoke. The longshoremen were then ordered to leave. At this point, the captain of Grandcamp ordered that no water be used, lest the cargo be ruined. Instead, he ordered all hatches sealed and the hold to be filled with steam in an attempt to smother the fire. This was unlikely to be effective, as ammonium nitrate is an oxidizer, thus neutralizing the extinguishing properties of steam. The steam may have contributed to the fire by converting the ammonium nitrate to nitrous oxide, while augmenting the already intense heat in the ship's hold. 

Around 8:30, the steam pressure became so great that it blew off the hatches. A column of yellow-orange smoke billowed out, the typical color for nitrogen dioxide fumes. The fire and its unusual-looking smoke attracted spectators along the shoreline, who believed they were at a safe distance. Responding fire departments included the Texas City volunteer fire department and the Republic Oil Refining Company firefighting team.

First explosion

At 9:12 a.m., the ammonium nitrate reached an explosive threshold from the combination of heat and pressure. Grandcamp detonated, causing utter destruction within 2,000 feet and extreme damage throughout the port. The tremendous blast produced a  shockwave, levelling nearly 1,000 buildings on land. Among the buildings destroyed was a Monsanto Chemical Company plant, killing 145 of its 450 workers. 

Flying shrapnel resulted in ignition of refineries and chemical tanks along the waterfront. Falling bales of burning twine from Grandcamps cargo added to the damage, and her anchor was hurled across the city. The explosion blew the almost  of the ship's steel into the air, some at supersonic speed. 

Official casualty estimates came to a total of 567, including all the crewmen who remained aboard Grandcamp. All but one member of the 28-man Texas City volunteer fire department were killed in the initial explosion on the docks while fighting the shipboard fire. With fires raging throughout Texas City, first responders from other areas were initially unable to reach the site of the disaster.

Second explosion
The first explosion had set High Flyer free from its moorings, and it had drifted across the harbor, coming to rest against SS Wilson B. Keene. Her crew stayed aboard for an hour before the smoke of the burning oil in the harbor forced them to leave. In the afternoon, two men boarded High Flyer searching for injured crewmembers. They noted that her cargo was ablaze and reported it to someone on the harborfront. This message seems to have gone unheeded for several hours until it was realized that this indicated a serious problem. Only around 11 p.m. did tugboats attempt to pull High Flyer away from the docks. Despite having cut her anchor, they were unable to move her. They fled the area around 1 a.m. the next day (April 17).

Twelve hours later, High Flyer exploded, killing two more people. According to witnesses, the explosion was more powerful than that of Grandcamp. Casualties were light since the docks had already been evacuated, but the second explosion exacerbated the damage to nearby ships and buildings. The blast destroyed the nearby Wilson B. Keene. The steel frame of High Flyer had been heated until glowing, and these chunks rained down upon Texas City setting mass fires. One of the propellers were blown off and subsequently found nearly a mile inland. It is now in a memorial park near the anchor of Grandcamp.

Scale of the disaster

The Texas City disaster is generally considered the worst industrial accident in U.S. history. Witnesses compared the scene to the fairly recent images of the 1943 air raid on Bari and the much larger devastation after an atomic bomb was dropped at Nagasaki. 

Of the dead, 405 were identified and 63 have never been identified. The latter remains were placed in a memorial cemetery in the north part of Texas City near Moses Lake. An additional 113 people were classified as missing, for no identifiable parts were ever found. This figure includes firefighters who were aboard Grandcamp when she exploded. There is some speculation that there were hundreds more killed but uncounted, including visiting seamen, undocumented laborers and their families, and an untold number of travelers. More than 800 people were left orphaned or widowed. However, there were also some survivors among people as close as 70 feet (21 m) from the dock. The victims' bodies quickly filled the local morgue. Several bodies were laid out in the local high school's gymnasium for identification by family or friends.

More than 5,000 people were injured, with 1,784 admitted to 21 area hospitals. More than 500 homes were destroyed and hundreds damaged, leaving 2,000 homeless. The seaport was destroyed, and many businesses were flattened or burned. Over 1,100 vehicles were damaged and 362 freight cars were obliterated; the property damage was estimated at $100 million. This number may not encompass the full scope of damage: a further $500 million of oil products burned.

A  anchor of Grandcamp was hurled 1.62 miles (2.61 km) and found in a 10-foot (3 m) crater. It was installed at a memorial park.  The other main  anchor was hurled  to the entrance of the Texas City Dike. It rests on a "Texas-shaped" memorial at the entrance. Burning wreckage ignited everything within miles, including dozens of oil and chemical tanks. The nearby city of Galveston was covered with an oily fog that left deposits over every exposed outdoor surface.

Firefighting casualties

Some of the deaths and damage in Texas City were due to the destruction and subsequent burning of several chemical plants (including Monsanto and Union Carbide), oil storage, and other facilities near the explosions. Twenty-seven of the twenty-eight members of Texas City's volunteer fire department and three of four members of the Texas City Heights Volunteer Fire Department who were on the docks near the burning ship were killed. One firefighter, Fred Dowdy, who had not responded to the initial call, coordinated other firefighters arriving from communities up to 60 miles (100 km) away. Alvin Fussell, sole survivor of the Heights Volunteer firefighters, was driving to work in Alvin when he heard of the fire on the radio. Eventually 200 firefighters arrived from as far away as Los Angeles. Fires resulting from the cataclysmic events were still burning a week after the disaster, and the process of body recovery took nearly a month. All four fire engines of Texas City were twisted and burned husks.

Cause
The cause of the initial fire on board Grandcamp was never determined. It may have been started by a cigarette discarded the previous day, meaning the ship's cargo had been smouldering throughout the night when the fire was discovered on the morning of the explosion. Historian Hugh Stephens later identified human error as the cause, and cites numerous reasons as to why a minor fire became such a severe incident.

Reactions and rebuilding
The disaster received national media attention, with offers of assistance coming from around the country. Several funds were established to handle donations, particularly the Texas City Relief Fund, created by the city's mayor Curtis Trahan. One of the largest fundraising efforts for the city and the victims of the disaster was organized by Sam Maceo, one of the two brothers who ran organized crime in Galveston at the time. Maceo organized a large-scale benefit on the island, featuring entertainers including Phil Harris, Frank Sinatra, and Ann Sheridan. In the end, the Texas City Relief Fund raised more than $1 million ($ in today's terms). Payouts for fire insurance claims reached nearly $4 million ($ in today's terms).

Within days of the disaster, major companies that had lost facilities in the explosions announced plans to rebuild in Texas City and in some cases to expand their operations. Some companies implemented policies of retaining all of the hourly workers who had previously worked at destroyed facilities with plans to use them in the rebuilding. Cost estimates of the industrial reconstruction were estimated at approximately $100 million ($ adjusted for inflation).

"Commemorating the 50th Anniversary of the explosion (...), just as the Phoenix bird symbolizes resurrection from the ashes of despair, the 'Phoenix Fountain' epitomizes courage and the triumph of the human spirit. (...) Chewatah, Washington Artist David Govedare was commissioned by Mayor Charles T. Doyle (...) [to] produce this twelve foot sculpture from half inch cor-ten steel. Architect Joseph Allen Hoover and City Engineer James McWhorter designed the fountain built by Texas City's Public Works Department."

Legal case
Many of the legal cases seeking compensation were combined into Elizabeth Dalehite, et al. v. United States, under the recently enacted Federal Tort Claims Act (FTCA). On April 13, 1950, the district court found the United States government responsible for a litany of negligent acts of omission and commission by 168 named agencies and their representatives, in the manufacture, packaging, and labeling of ammonium nitrate. This was further compounded by errors in transport, storage, loading, fire prevention, and fire suppression, all of which led to the explosions and the subsequent carnage.  

On June 10, 1952, the U.S. Fifth Circuit Court of Appeals overturned this decision, finding that the United States maintained the right to exercise its own "discretion" in vital national matters. The U.S. Supreme Court affirmed that decision (346 U.S. 15, June 8, 1953), in a 4-to-3 opinion, noting that the district court had no jurisdiction under the federal statute to find the government liable for "negligent planning decisions" which were properly delegated to various departments and agencies. In short, the FTCA clearly exempts "failure to exercise or perform a discretionary function or duty", and the court found that all of the alleged acts in this case were discretionary in nature.

In its dissent, the three justices argued that, under the FTCA, "Congress has defined the tort liability of the government as analogous to that of a private person", i.e., when carrying out duties unrelated to governing. In this case, "a policy adopted in the exercise of an immune discretion was carried out carelessly by those in charge of detail", and that a private person would certainly be held liable for such acts. A private person is held to a higher standard of care when carrying out "inherently dangerous" acts such as transportation and storage of explosives.

According to Melvin Belli in his book Ready for the Plaintiff! (1965), Congress acted to provide some compensation after the courts refused to do so. The Dalehite decision was eventually "appealed" to Congress, where relief was granted by means of legislation (Public Law 378, 69 Stat. 707 (1955)). When the last claim had been processed in 1957, 1,394 awards totaling nearly $17 million had been made.

See also

 List of ammonium nitrate disasters
 Largest artificial non-nuclear explosions
 Halifax Explosion
 Oppau explosion (1921)
 West Fertilizer Company explosion in West, Texas
 2015 Tianjin explosions
 2020 Beirut explosion

References

External links

 Final reports
Record of Proceedings of Board Investigation Inquiring Into Losses By Fires and Explosions of the French Steamship Grandcamp and U.S. Steamships Highflyer and Wilson B. Keene at Texas City, Texas 16 and 17 April 1947, U.S. Coast Guard, U.S. Treasury Department, pages 538-550

 Legal documents
Supreme Court opinion, Dalehite v. U.S., 1953

 Collections and galleries
1947 Texas City Disaster Web Exhibit from the Moore Memorial Public Library in Texas City
"The Explosion: 50 years later, Texas City still remembers." - Collection of articles by the Houston Chronicle

 Other links
Headline, NY Times, April 17, 1947, Blasts and Fires Wreck Texas City of 15,000; 300 to 1,200 Dead; Thousands Hurt, Homeless; Wide Coast Area Rocked, Damage in Millions
Texas City Disaster, 1947 photographs from the Moore Memorial Public Library, hosted by the Portal to Texas History
Handbook of Texas entry
Olafson, Steve. "THE EXPLOSION: 50 YEARS LATER, TEXAS CITY STILL REMEMBERS/'Texas City just blew up'/A powerful chemical explosion 50 years ago propelled a small port town into an unwelcome national and world spotlight." Houston Chronicle. Sunday April 13, 1997. Special 2.
Gonzales, J.R. "Newly discovered photos show extent of destruction at Texas City." Houston Chronicle. April 16, 2010.
Details and photos of local destruction
 Joint report of Fire Preventions and Engineering Board of Texas and the National Board of Fire Underwriters
Images from the day after the explosion at the UH Digital Library
Footage appears in the film Encounters with Disaster, released in 1979 and produced by Sun Classic Pictures.  Viewable on the Internet Archive.
The Texas City Disaster (1947) Film by the Texas Department of Public Safety on Texas Archive of the Moving Image

 
Industrial fires and explosions in the United States
Explosions in 1947
1947 in Texas
Disasters in Texas
Fires in Texas
Galveston County, Texas
Law of negligence
Texas City, Texas
Urban fires in the United States
Maritime incidents in 1947
April 1947 events in the United States
Ammonium nitrate disasters
1947 disasters in the United States